The Paipai (Pai pai, Pa'ipai, Akwa'ala, Yakakwal) are an indigenous people of Mexico living in northern Baja California. Their traditional territory lies between the Kiliwa on the south and the Kumeyaay and Cocopa on the north, and extending from San Vicente near the Pacific coast nearly to the Colorado River's delta in the east. Today they are concentrated primarily at the multi-ethnic community of Santa Catarina in Baja California's Sierra de Juárez.

Population
Meigs suggested that the aboriginal populations associated with San Vicente and Santa Catarina missions were respectively 780 and 1,000 individuals. Hicks estimated 1,800 for the aboriginal population of the Paipai, or a density of 0.3 persons per square kilometer. Owen argued that these estimates were substantially too high. However some studies show that there are less than 200 speakers of the Paipai language left, because the new generations do not find it necessary to learn the Paipai language.

Language

The Paipai language was documented by Judith Joël, who have published texts and studies of phonology, morphology and syntax. Mauricio J. Mixco have published transcription of stories. It is very close to the Upland Yuman language spoken by the Yavapai, Walapai, and Havasupai of western Arizona.

Subsistence
Aboriginal Paipai subsistence was based on hunting and gathering of natural animal and plants rather than on agriculture. Numerous plants were exploited as food resources, notably including agave, yucca, mesquite, prickly pear, acorns, pine nuts, and juniper berries. Many other plants served as medicine or as material for construction or craft products. Animals used for food included deer, pronghorn, bighorn sheep, rabbits, woodrats, various other medium and small mammals, quail, fish, and shellfish. Crop growing and stock raising were introduced during the historic period.

Culture

Information about the cultural practices of the precontact Paipai comes from a variety of sources. These include the accounts of the maritime expedition led by Sebastián Vizcaíno; reports by late 18th and early 19th century observers, such as Luis Sales and José Longinos Martínez; and the studies of 20th century ethnographers, including Edward W. Gifford, Robert H. Lowie, Peveril Meigs, Philip Drucker, William D. Hohenthal, Roger C. Owen, Thomas B. Hinton, Frederic N. Hicks, Ralph C. Michelsen, Michael Wilken-Robertson, and Julia Bendímez Patterson.

Material culture
Paipai traditional material culture included structures (rectangular thatched-roof houses, ramadas, and probably sweathouses), equipment for hunting and warfare (bows, cane arrows, war clubs, nets), processing equipment (pottery, basketry, manos and metates, mortars and pestles, cordage, stone knives, awls), clothing (rabbitskin robes, fiber sandals; buckskin aprons and basketry caps for women), and cradles.

Social organization
Kinship was based on patrilineal, patrilocal šimułs. It is not clear to what extent communities coincided with šimułs prehistorically; in historic times, community membership was quite fluid. The existence of any formal community leaders was denied by some; if they were present, their authority was probably not strong.

Social recreations included a variety of games: shinny, kickball races, the ring-and-pin game, dice, peon, archery, spinning tops, juggling, and cat's cradle. Music was produced by singing and by instruments that included flutes, gourd rattles, and jinglers. Pets were kept.

Traditional narratives
Traditional narratives are conventionally classed as myths, legends, tales, and oral histories. The oral literature recorded for the Paipai is rather limited but includes narratives that can be assigned to each of these categories. Paipai narratives such as the creation myth show their closest affinities with those of the Kumeyaay to the north.

History
The Paipai first encountered Europeans when Sebastián Vizcaíno's expedition mapped the northwest coast of Baja California in 1602. More intensive and sustained contacts began in 1769 when the expedition to establish Spanish settlements in California, led by Gaspar de Portolà and Junípero Serra, passed through the western portions.

The Dominican mission of San Vicente was founded near the coast in Paipai territory in 1780. It became a key center for the Spanish administration and military control of the region. In 1797 San Vicente was supplemented by an inland mission at Santa Catarina, near the boundary between Paipai and Kumeyaay territories. Mission Santa Catarina was destroyed in 1840 by hostile Indian forces, apparently including Paipai.

The main modern settlement of Paipai is at Santa Catarina, a community they share with Kumeyaay and Kiliwa residents.

References

Further reading
 Drucker, Philip. 1941. "Culture Element Distributions XVII: Yuman–Piman". Anthropological Records 6:91-230. University of California, Berkeley.
 Gifford, E. W., and Robert H. Lowie. 1928. "Notes on the Akwa'ala Indians of Lower California". University of California Publications in American Archaeology and Ethnology 23:338-352. Berkeley.
 Hicks, Frederic N. 1959. "Archaeological Sites in the Jamau-Jaquijel Region, Baja California: A Preliminary Report". University of California, Los Angeles, Archaeological Survey Annual Report 1958-1959:59-66.
 Hicks, Frederic N. 1963. Ecological Aspects of Aboriginal Culture in the Western Yuman Area. Unpublished Ph.D. dissertation, Department of Anthropology, University of California, Los Angeles.
 Hinton, Thomas B., and Roger C. Owen. 1957. "Some Surviving Yuman Groups in Northern Baja California". América Indígena 17:87-102.
 Hohenthal, William D. Jr. 2001. Tipai Ethnographic Notes: A Baja California Indian Community at Mid Century. Edited by Thomas Blackburn. Ballena Press, Menlo Park, California.
 Joël, Judith. 1966. Paipai Phonology and Morphology. Unpublished Ph.D. dissertation, Department of Anthropology, University of California, Los Angeles.
 Joël, Judith. 1976. "Some Paipai Accounts of Food Gathering". Journal of California Anthropology 3:59-71.
 Joël, Judith. 1998. "Another Look at the Paipai-Arizona Pai Divergence". In Studies in American Indian Languages: Description and Theory, edited by Leanne Hinton and Pamela Munro, pp. 32–40. University of California, Berkeley.
 Laylander, Don. 1991. "Organización comunitaria de los yumanos occidentales: una revisión ethnográfica y prospecto arqueológico". Estudios Fronterizos 24-25:31-60.
 Magaña Mancillas, Mario Alberto. 2005. Ni muy tristona, ni muy tristona: testimonios de mujeres paipai y kumiai de Baja California. Instituto de Cultura de Baja California, Mexicali, Mexico.
 Meigs, Peveril, III. 1939. The Kiliwa Indians of Lower California. Iberoamerica No. 15. University of California, Berkeley.
 Meigs, Peveril, III. 1977. "Notes on the Paipai of San Isidoro, Baja California". Pacific Coast Archaeological Society Quarterly 13(1):11-20.
 Mixco, Mauricio J. 1977. "The Linguistic Affiliation of the Ñakipa and Yakakwal of Lower California". International Journal of American Linguistics 43:189-200.
 Mixco, Mauricio J. 1977. "Textos para la etnohistoria en la frontera dominicana de Baja California". Tlalocan 7:205-226.
 Mixco, Mauricio J. 1984. "Paipai Literature". In Spirit Mountain: An Anthology of Yuman Story and Song, edited by Leanne Hinton and Lucille J. Watahomigie, pp. 191–223. University of Arizona Press, Tucson.
 Mixco, Mauricio J. 1985. "Etnohistoria pai pai en la Baja California". Meyibó 2(5):21-43.
 Mixco, Mauricio J. 1989. "Versión de la 'guerra de la venganza': texto mitológico de la Baja California indígena (un texto paipai)" Tlalocan 11:199-216.
 Mixco, Mauricio J. 2006. "The Indigenous Languages". In The Prehistory of Baja California: Advances in the Archaeology of the Forgotten Peninsula, edited by Don Laylander and Jerry D. Moore, pp. 24–41. University Press of Florida, Gainesville.
 Owen, Roger C. 1962. The Indians of Santa Catarina, Baja California: Concepts of Disease and Curing. Unpublished Ph.D. dissertation, Department of Anthropology, University of California, Los Angeles.
 Wilken-Robertson, Michael. 1982. "The Paipai Potters of Baja California: A Living Tradition". The Masterkey 60:18-26.
 Winter, Werner. 1967. "The Identity of the Paipai (Akwa'ala)." In Studies in Southwestern Ethnolinguistics: Meaning and History in the Language of the American Southwest, edited by Dell H. Hymes and William E. Bittle, pp. 371–378. Mouton, The Hague.
 Bendímez Patterson, Julia. 1989. Historia oral: Benito Peralta de Santa Catarina, comunidad pai-pai. Universidad Autónoma de Baja California, Mexicali, Mexico. (Includes oral history and local traditions.)
 Gifford, Edward Winslow, and R. H. Lowie. 1928. "Notes on the Akwa'ala Indians of Lower California". University of California Publications in American Archaeology and Ethnology 23:338-352. Berkeley. (Creation myth narrated by Jackrabbit in 1921-1922, pp. 350–351.)
 Hinton, Leanne, and Lucille J. Watahomigie. 1984. Spirit Mountain: An Anthology of Yuman Story and Song. University of Arizona Press, Tucson. (Includes a narrative collected by Mauricio J. Mixco from Rufino Ochurte, pp. 201–222.)
 Joël, Judith. 1976. "The Earthquake of '57: A Paipai Text". In Yuman Texts, edited by Margaret Langdon, pp. 84–91. University of Chicago Press.
 Meigs, Peveril, III. 1977. "Notes on the Paipai of San Isidoro, Baja California". Pacific Coast Archaeological Society Quarterly 13(1):11-20. (Brief note on creation myth recorded in 1929, p. 15.)

External links

 Santa Caterina Pai Pai Indians Indigenous Community, Kumeyaay.info
 Paipai Indians of Mexico provide important links to Yavapai Indians, by Pamela Williams

Ethnic groups in Mexico
Indigenous peoples in Mexico